The Sword of Granada (Spanish:El corazón y la espada) is a 1953 Mexican historical adventure film directed by Edward Dein and Carlos Véjar hijo and starring Cesar Romero, Katy Jurado and Rebeca Iturbide.

It was released in the United States in 1956.

Cast
 Cesar Romero as Don Pedro de Rivera  
 Katy Jurado as Lolita  
 Rebeca Iturbide as Princesa Esme  
 Tito Junco as Ponce de León  
 Miguel Ángel Ferriz as Padre Angélico  
 Fernando Casanova as Capitán del califa  
 Gloria Mestre as Mensajera de Princesa Esme  
 Víctor Alcocer as Califa de Granada  
 José Torvay 
 Norma Ancira as Sara, doncella de Esme  
 Manuel Casanueva as Alquimista  
 Antonio Haro Oliva
 Ramón Sánchez as Azotador

References

Bibliography 
 Quinlan, David. Quinlan's Film Stars. Batsford, 2000.

External links 
 

1953 films
1950s historical adventure films
Mexican historical adventure films
1950s Spanish-language films
Films set in Spain
Mexican black-and-white films
Films directed by Edward Dein
1950s Mexican films